River Valley School District was a school district in Lawrence County, Arkansas. It served Poughkeepsie and Strawberry.

It was formed on July 1, 1992, by the merger of the Poughkeepsie School District and the Strawberry School District. On July 1, 2004, it merged with the Lynn School District to form the Hillcrest School District.

References

Further reading
  (Download) - Boundaries of the predecessor districts

External links
 
 

Education in Lawrence County, Arkansas
1992 establishments in Arkansas
School districts established in 1992
2004 disestablishments in Arkansas
School districts disestablished in 2004
Defunct school districts in Arkansas